Tip on a Dead Jockey is a 1957 American drama film directed by Richard Thorpe and starring Robert Taylor and Dorothy Malone. It is based on The New Yorker 1954 short story by Irwin Shaw.

Plot
Phyllis Tredman is shocked when her husband Lloyd, a decorated Korean War U.S. Air Force pilot, sends word to her after his discharge from military service requesting a divorce.

She tracks him down in Madrid, Spain, where it turns out Lloyd is drinking and gambling heavily. He is tormented by having ordered so many Air Force pilots to their deaths on dangerous missions. He also is strangely attracted to Paquita, the wife of his friend and fellow pilot Jimmy Heldon.

A mysterious man named Bert Smith, aware that Lloyd is down on his luck, offers him $25,000 to do something illegal and dangerous—smuggling currency from Cairo to Madrid, dropping the box of cash in mid-air. Lloyd has wagered his last $1,000 on a horse race. He says if the horse wins, he won't need Smith's offer, but the race ends tragically with the jockey killed. Lloyd suspects foul play.

Jimmy takes the job after Lloyd refuses. He ends up missing and Paquita blames Lloyd, calling him a coward. It turns out to be a test run from which Jimmy returns late but safely. He intends to go through with the crime, risking everything, but Lloyd knocks him out and pilots the plane himself.

Steadying himself after first being paralyzed with fear, Lloyd's flight goes badly when a propeller is damaged. Authorities are put on alert and Interpol agents begin tracking the plane. Lloyd tries to hide the money, only to discover narcotics are being smuggled by Bert as well.

He drops the box from the sky as planned, but notifies Interpol and gets Bert arrested at the scene of the crime. The thankful authorities elect not to punish Lloyd, who returns to Phyllis' open arms.

Cast
 Robert Taylor as Lloyd Tredman
 Dorothy Malone as Phyllis Tredman
 Marcel Dalio as Toto del Aro
 Martin Gabel as Bert Smith
 Gia Scala as Paquita Heldon
 Jack Lord as Jimmy Heldon
 Hayden Rorke as J. R. Nichols
 Joyce Jameson as Sue Fan Finley

Production
At one stage, Orson Welles was going to direct the film.

It is also the first MGM film to open with the current roaring lion in the studio's logo.

Reception
According to MGM records the film earned $400,000 in the US and Canada and $650,000 elsewhere resulting in a loss of $886,000.

See also
 List of American films of 1957

References

External links

1957 films
1957 crime drama films
American crime drama films
American aviation films
American black-and-white films
1950s English-language films
Films about the illegal drug trade
Films based on short fiction
Films scored by Miklós Rózsa
Films directed by Richard Thorpe
Films set in Madrid
Metro-Goldwyn-Mayer films
Films with screenplays by Charles Lederer
1950s American films